Tota Weds Maina is an Indian Comedy-Drama television show, which premiered on 14 January 2013 and  was broadcast on SAB TV. The show starred Gaurav Gera and Kavita Kaushik.

Cast
 Gaurav Gera as Totaram Tiwari
 Kavita Kaushik as Maina Shukla
 Atul Srivastava as Tota's Father
 Samta Sagar as Ramdulari (Tota's Mother)
 Samiksha Bhatt as Aarti
 Surbhi Tiwari as Pushpa
 Sushil Bounthiyal as Totaram's Uncle
 Sandesh Nayak
 Kajal Nishad as Ram Katori Chachi
 Ishtiyaq Khan
 Priyani Vani
 Shyamlal
 Eklavya Bhetaria
 Simran Natekar
 Shahnawaz Pradhan
 Ranjeet as cameo appearance

References

External links
 Official website

Sony SAB original programming
Indian comedy television series
Indian television soap operas
2013 Indian television series debuts
2013 Indian television series endings